Neaetha maxima is a jumping spider species in the genus Neaetha that lives in Nigeria. The female was first described in 2011.

References

Endemic fauna of Nigeria
Salticidae
Fauna of Nigeria
Spiders of Africa
Spiders described in 2011
Taxa named by Wanda Wesołowska